The 2021–22 DePaul Blue Demons men's basketball team represented DePaul University during the 2021–22 NCAA Division I men's basketball season. They were led by first year head coach Tony Stubblefield and played their home games at Wintrust Arena in Chicago, Illinois as members of the Big East Conference.

Previous season
In a season limited due to the ongoing COVID-19 pandemic, the Blue Demons finished the 2020–21 season 5–14, 2–13 in Big East play to finish in last place. They defeated Providence in the first round of the Big East tournament before losing to UConn in the quarterfinals.

After finishing in last place in the Big East for a fifth consecutive year, the school fired head coach Dave Leitao on March 15, 2021. On April 1, the school named long-time Oregon assistant Stubblefield the team's new head coach.

Offseason

Departures

Incoming transfers

2021 recruiting class

Roster

Schedule and results 
DePaul experience positive COVID-19 tests prior to its scheduled game against Northwestern on December 18, 2021, resulting in the cancellation of the game.
|-
!colspan=12 style=| Exhibition

|-
!colspan=12 style=| Non-conference regular season

|-
!colspan=12 style=|Big East regular season

|-
!colspan=12 style=|Big East tournament

Source

Awards and honors

Big East Conference honors

All-Big East Second Team
Javon Freeman-Liberty

Source

References

DePaul Blue Demons men's basketball seasons
DePaul
DePaul